Tallah is an American nu metal band from Pennsylvania. They are currently signed to Earache Records. The band consists of vocalist Justin Bonitz, lead guitarist Derrick Schneider, rhythm guitarist Alex Snowden, drummer Max Portnoy, and turntablist/keyboardist Alizé "Mewzen" Rodriguez.

The band was formed in 2017 by drummer Max Portnoy (son of Mike Portnoy), lead guitarist Derrick Schneider, and bassist Andrew Cooper. The band has released two studio albums, Matriphagy (2020) and The Generation of Danger (2022). Often described as a "nu-core" band, Tallah mixes nu metal, and hardcore, with elements of deathcore and rap.

History

Formation and No One Should Read This (2017–2020)

Tallah was formed in 2017 by drummer Max Portnoy (son of Dream Theater's drummer Mike Portnoy), Next to None guitarist Derrick Schneider, and bassist Andrew Cooper. They picked up two other rhythm guitarists, AJ Wisniewski and Nick Malfara, and tried out a couple of different vocalists, but they were not what Max was looking for. Portnoy knew of future singer Justin Bonitz through Bonitz's YouTube channels, Hungry Lights and Hungry Covers. Justin joined the band on January 1, 2018. At the end of 2017, the band had already recorded instrumental demos for their EP No One Should Read This and within a week Bonitz had written lyrics and self-recorded vocals for each track. Their first live performance was on January 7, 2018, at The Saint Vitus Bar in Brooklyn, New York, played as a six-piece with three guitarists. The band then held the supporting slot for A Killer's Confession on tour.

During their first tour, in May 2018, the band released a music video for their first single, "Placenta." One of the three guitarists left, so they continued as a five-piece. In June 2018, AJ left the band, and they picked up Eric Novroski as their new rhythm guitarist. In August 2018, they released a music video for their song "Cottonmouth". On April 25, 2019, the band announced that they had signed to Earache Records. On July 18, 2019, the band played a show at The Lizard Lounge in Lancaster, Pennsylvania, during which Bonitz climbed onto the ceiling of the venue. A security guard told him to get down, leading to Bonitz punching and kicking the guard. Bonitz claims he did not know the person was a security guard and that they violently grabbed him first while he was still hanging from an I-beam. He was subsequently arrested before being released on bail. The band released a music video for the song "Red Light" on January 21, 2020, and announced that they were entering the studio with Josh Schroeder. In October 2019, the band parted ways with Eric, and in January 2020, they went to the studio as a four-piece, with Alizé "Mewzen" Rodriguez tagging along as their unofficial DJ.

Matriphagy, Talladdin and line-up changes (2020–2022)

On June 5, 2020, Tallah released "The Silo", the lead single for their debut studio album, Matriphagy. On July 2, 2020, the band released "We, the Sad" as the second single. On July 23, 2020, "Red Light" was released as the third single. On August 6, 2020, "Placenta" was released as the fourth single. On August 20, 2020, "Overconfidence" was released as the fifth single. On September 11, 2020, "L.E.D." was released as the sixth and final single. Matriphagy was released on October 2, 2020. 

Tallah released a live shot concert on October 1, 2020, in which they played their debut album Matriphagy from front to back. Here, they announced that Mewzen would be an official member, and they also debuted their new rhythm guitarist, Alex Snowden from Doll Skin.

On April 1, 2021, Tallah announced the Talladdin EP alongside the first single "Friend Like Me". This EP consists of five covers from the Aladdin soundtrack exclusive to their Patreon page.

On August 17, 2021, they released the single and music video "Vanilla Paste", featuring guest vocals from Grant Hood of Guerilla Warfare, AJ Channer of Fire From the Gods, and Tom Barber of Chelsea Grin. On November 21, they announced that they had parted ways with their founding bassist Andrew Cooper, citing musical differences.

The Generation of Danger (2022–present)

On March 9, 2022, they released the single and music video "Telescope", and announced their upcoming album entitled The Generation of Danger, along with a temporary release date of September 9, 2022. The band supported All That Remains on their spring 2022 US tour that began on March 12, 2022, in Worcester, Massachusetts. On April 19, 2022, they released the second single off the album, "The Impressionist" with a music video. In August 2022, they announced that the album's release would be pushed back to November 18. On September 1, 2022, they released "Shaken (Not Stirred)" as a single with a music video. On October 13, 2022, they released the single "For the Recognition" with a music video. On November 10, 2022, they released the fifth and final single "Dicker's Done". The Generation of Danger was released on November 18, 2022.

Musical style and influences
Tallah's musical style has been described as nu metal, alternative metal, nu metalcore, metalcore, and hardcore punk. John D. Buchanan of AllMusic described the Tallah as a "nu-core" quartet...[that brings] back the spirit of early-2000s nu-metal with gnarly riffs, whipcrack drums, electronic textures, and tortured vocals." AllMusic also noted influences "contemporary hardcore". Tallah's music also includes elements of deathcore, death metal, and rap. Phillip Trapp of Revolver described their second album, The Generation of Danger, as "a ferocious fusion of early Slipknot intensity — spitfire vocals and grooves that dig deep...and modern hardcore savagery à la Vein.fm and Knocked Loose. The band has also been referred to as "nu-core". Vocalist Justin Bonitz cites Slipknot, Linkin Park, Korn, System Of A Down, Code Orange, Fire from the Gods, and Knocked Loose as his influences. Drummer Max Portnoy cites Joey Jordison and Chris Adler as his influences.

Band members

Current members

 Derrick Schneider – lead guitar, backing vocals 
 Max Portnoy – drums, percussion 
 Justin Bonitz – vocals 
 Alizé "Mewzen" Rodriguez – turntables, samples, keyboards 
 Alex Snowden – rhythm guitar 

Former members
 Nick Malfara – rhythm guitar 
 AJ Wisniewski – rhythm guitar 
 Eric Novroski – rhythm guitar 
 Andrew Cooper – bass 

Touring musicians
 Marc Naples – bass 
 Tyler Hinson – bass 
 Matthew Ryan – drums 
 Joel McDonald – drums 
 Tyler Bogliole – drums 

Timeline

Discography

Albums 

 Matriphagy (2020)
  The Generation of Danger (2022)

EPs 

 No One Should Read This (2018)
 Talladdin (2021)

Singles 
 "Placenta" (2018)
 "Gooba" (2020)
 "The Silo" (2020)
 "We, the Sad" (2020)
 "Red Light" (2020)
 "Placenta" (2020)
 "Overconfidence" (2020)
 "L.E.D." (2020)
 "Friend Like Me" (2021)
 "Vanilla Paste" (2021)
 "Telescope" (2022)
 "The Impressionist" (2022)
 "Shaken (Not Stirred)" (2022)
 "For the Recognition" (2022)
 "Dicker's Done" (2022)

References

External links 

Official website

Tallah on Bandcamp
Tallah discography on Discogs

Heavy metal musical groups from Pennsylvania
Musical groups established in 2018
2018 establishments in Pennsylvania
Earache Records artists
American nu metal musical groups
Hardcore punk groups from Pennsylvania
Metalcore musical groups from Pennsylvania